is a Japanese actress and tarento, from the Okayama prefecture. A practitioner of Karate, her real name that she was given at birth is Misaki Yasui.

Filmography 
 Parade - schoolgirl (2010)
 Gachinko Kenka Joto - Azusa Kinoshita (2010) 
 Gothic & Lolita Psycho - Lady El (2010)
 Mobile Boyfriend + - Kaori Endo (2012)
 Ima, Yari ni Yukimasu - Orie (2012)
 Zyuden Sentai Kyoryuger: Gaburincho of Music - Lemnear (2013)
 7 Days Report - Kaori Kudo (2014)
 Girl's Blood - Momomi  (2014)
 Alps jogakuen - Nishiki Takahashi(2014)
 Space Sheriff Sharivan: Next Generation - Sissy (2014)
 Space Sheriff Shaider: Next Generation - Sissy (2014)
 Fantastic Girls - Mizuno Sasayama (2015)
 Girls in Trouble: Space Squad Episode Zero - Sissy (2017)
 Momo to kiji - Sakura Machida (2017)

Tv Dramas
 Pink no Idenshi - Nao Matsuda (2005)
 Arienai! - Mai Touyama (2010)
 Manpuku Shoujo Dragonette - Runa Tsukasagi (2010)
 The Ancient Dogoo Girls - Doji-chan (2010)
 Naotora: The Lady Warlord - Akane (2017)
 Zero: Dragon Blood - Raira (2017)

External links 
 Official Site 
 Official Blog 
 

1993 births
Living people
People from Okayama
21st-century Japanese actresses